Pool C of the First Round of the 2006 World Baseball Classic was held at Hiram Bithorn Stadium, San Juan, Puerto Rico from March 7 to 10, 2006.

Pool C was a round-robin tournament. Each team played the other three teams once, with the top two teams advancing to Pool 2.

Standings

Results
All times are Atlantic Standard Time (UTC−04:00).

Puerto Rico 2, Panama 1

Cuba 8, Panama 6

Puerto Rico 8, Netherlands 3

Cuba 11, Netherlands 2

Netherlands 10, Panama 0

Puerto Rico 12, Cuba 2

References

External links
Official website

Pool C
World Baseball Classic Pool C
21st century in San Juan, Puerto Rico
International baseball competitions hosted by Puerto Rico
World Baseball Classic Pool C
Sports in San Juan, Puerto Rico